Vladimir Vissarionovich Lyubimov (February 24, 1879 – December 10, 1937) was a Soviet military leader.

Biography

Service start 
Born in to an upper-class family. He graduated from the Samara men's gymnasium, and then the Kazan Junker School. In 1904, he participated in the Russian-Japanese war. Lieutenant. After the war, he served in the 211st infantry reserve Evpatoria regiment, and then in the Lithuanian 51st infantry regiment. In 1914, he graduated from two courses of the Nikolaev Military Academy.

Participation in World War I
Captain of the 51st Lithuanian Regiment. After that, the senior adjutant of the headquarters of the 13th Infantry Division, and then the 5th Siberian Army Corps. Lyubimov rose to the rank of Podpolkovnik (Lieutenant colonel).

Participation in the civil war
Voluntarily joined the Red Army. In 1918-1920, he successively held the post of chief of the operational department of the headquarters of the 8th Army, chief of the 12th Infantry Division, chief of staff of the 8th army, commander of the 8th army, chief of staff of the 3rd army, chief of the 55th infantry division, chief of staff Caucasian Front, the commander of the Caucasian Labor Army, chief of staff of the 2nd Special Army, chief of staff of the 5th army.

After the civil war
In 1920-22, the chief of staff of the East Siberian District. In 1923-24, the chief of staff of the 12th Rifle Corps, and then the Chief of Staff of the 5th Army. Since 1926, the headquarters of the 16th Rifle Corps. In 1929, he graduated from KUVNAS at the Frunze Academy. In 1931, he was transferred to the reserve (in connection with the activities of the OGPU in the operation "Spring"). Since 1932, the military leader of the Rostov Road Institute. Kombrig (1936). Senior Head of the Tactics Department of the Military Academy of Mechanization and Motorization of the Red Army.

Arrest and death
In June 1937, due to political distrust, he was transferred to the reserve. In July 1937, he was arrested. Accused of participating in an anti-Soviet terrorist spy organization, on December 10, 1937, Lyubimov was sentenced to death and shot the same day.

References

1879 births
1937 deaths
Russian military personnel of World War I
Soviet military personnel of the Russian Civil War
Great Purge victims from Russia
People executed by the Soviet Union